Virginia Kilborn is a professor and radio astronomer with the Centre for Astrophysics and Supercomputing at Swinburne University and is Swinburne's first Chief Scientist. She researches galaxy evolution by studying their gas content and is working on the surveys of the next generation of radio telescopes, including the Australian SKA Pathfinder.

Career 
Kilborn peered through her first telescope in 1986 to watch Halley’s Comet, a once in 75 year event.

She completed her PhD at the University of Melbourne before undertaking post-doctoral research at Jodrell Bank observatory in England.

Kilborn then undertook a ARC-CSIRO linkage fellowship at Swinburne’s Centre for Astrophysics and Supercomputing (CAS) in Melbourne in 2003. She began teaching the Swinburne Astronomy online program in 2006, lecturing in undergraduate Astronomy. She became Deputy Director from 2011–2013 and Acting Director for CAS in 2013. In 2015 Kilborn became Chair of the Department of Physics and Astronomy before becoming Dean of Science in 2019, remaining in that role until her appointment as Swinburne's first Chief Scientist in May 2021.

Kilborn served as president of the Astronomical Society of Australia from 2015–2017 and, is chair of the National Committee for Astronomy for the Australian Academy of Science. 

Kilborn also leads many gender equity initiatives. She is chair of the CAS equity committee and a leader of university-wide programs to promote academic women and their careers.

Awards and recognition 

 Honorary Fellow, Astronomical Society of Australia, 2022
 Vice-Chancellors Award for Culture and Values, Swinburne, 2015
 Vice-Chancellors Teaching Award (team SAO), Swinburne, 2012
 National, OLT Citation for Outstanding contributions to student learning, SAO core team, Swinburne, 2012
 Vice-Chancellors Early Career Research Award, Swinburne 2006

References 

living people
Australian astronomers
Academic staff of Swinburne University of Technology
University of Melbourne alumni
Year of birth missing (living people)
Australian women scientists